Embedded is a 2016 erotic political thriller film written and directed by Stephen Sewell and produced by Steve Jaggi, which sees a war correspondent meet an alluring, enigmatic woman at a cocktail party, before a dangerous power play engulfs the two. The film stars Nick Barkla, Laura Gordon, Ryan Harrison, Marcus Johnson and Peter Phelps. The film premiered at the Sydney Film Festival to generally positive reviews, with Variety calling it a "diamond like work", while The Iris called Embedded "a compelling watch."

Cast
 Nick Barkla as Frank
 Laura Gordon as Madeline
 Peter Phelps as Cassidy
 Ryan Harrison as Lance Corporal Jackson
 Marcus Johnson as Porter
 Rosie Lourde as Jade
 Jak Wyld as Sergent Henderson

References

External links
 

Australian erotic thriller films
2010s political thriller films
2016 films
2010s erotic thriller films
2010s English-language films
2010s Australian films